The 1999 Vuelta a España was the 54th edition of the Vuelta a España, one of cycling's Grand Tours. The Vuelta began in Murcia, with a prologue individual time trial on 4 September, and Stage 11 occurred on 16 September with a stage from Huesca. The race finished in Madrid on 26 September.

Stage 11
16 September 1999 — Huesca to Val d'Aran/,

Stage 12
17 September 1999 — Sort to Arcalis,

Stage 13
18 September 1999 — Andorra la Vella to Castellar del Riu,

Stage 14
19 September 1999 — Barcelona to Barcelona,

Stage 15
20 September 1999 — La Sénia to Valencia,

Stage 16
21 September 1999 — Valencia to Teruel,

Stage 17
22 September 1999 — Bronchales to Guadalajara,

Stage 18

Stage 19
24 September 1999 — San Lorenzo de El Escorial to Ávila,

Stage 20
25 September 1999 — El Tiemblo to Ávila,  (ITT)

Stage 21
26 September 1999 — Madrid to Madrid,

References

1999 Vuelta a España
Vuelta a España stages